Founded in 2010, the New York Digital District (NYDD) is an initiative located in the DUMBO area of Brooklyn, NY, USA. Representing more than 80 digital businesses  The District promotes the area's   ability to support an array of businesses, from technology to startups to agencies. The NYDD is an organized body of professionals dedicated to advocacy to support the viability of the area as a  location with the  ability to support a vast array of businesses .

History 

The NYDD was announced at the area's monthly event, Digital DUMBO, in January 2010. The announcement was made by Mike Germano of Carrot Creative, Brian Lemond of Brooklyn United and the Brooklyn Digital Foundry, and Sam Lessin formerly of Drop.io. Other members include Big Spaceship, Etsy, and Huge Inc.

The DUMBO section of Brooklyn, known as such for its position down under the Manhattan Bridge overpass, a former manufacturing and light industrial section of the city, has over the past decade experienced a renaissance as the new home for digital business. Attracted to affordable rents and large, light-filled spaces, early digital pioneers helped local residents and artists recast the neighborhood in a positive light.  The NYDD works closely with the DUMBO Business Improvement District and is home to one of the most recognized New York gathering for the digital industry, Digital Dumbo.

The organization centers around a series of initiatives and committees, through which volunteers from local businesses rally to share ideas and incite progress on issues as diverse as welcoming new businesses, improving technology infrastructure and supports, and drawing attention to the urgent need for additional real estate for the expanding business community.

Initiatives

Digital Census 

One key initiative is the NYDD Annual Digital Census, a survey that provides aggregate, anonymous, year-over-year data on the needs and profiles of the area's businesses.

Internship Fair 

Another initiative is the NYDD's bi-annual internship fair, launching in April, 2012. The fair will create a centralized arena for emerging professionals and students to meet leaders from the digital industry and to learn about employment prospects.

References

External links 

Organizations based in New York City
Dumbo, Brooklyn
Information technology places
2010 establishments in New York City